Román Martínez may refer to:

Román Martínez (boxer) (born 1983), Puerto Rican boxer
Román Martínez (footballer, born 1983), Argentine football midfielder
Román Martínez (basketball) (born 1988), American-born Mexican basketball player
Román Martínez (footballer, born 2002), Mexican football forward